Çataltepe is a village in the Gölbaşı District, Adıyaman Province, Turkey. Its population is 338 (2021).

The hamlet of Karamağara and Tecirli are attached to the village.

References

Villages in Gölbaşı District, Adıyaman Province